Flavio Chigi (10 May 1631 – 13 September 1693) was an Italian Catholic Cardinal and Duke of Ariccia. He was Cardinal-Nephew to Pope Alexander VII and became a powerful political force inside the Roman Catholic Church during the latter half of the 17th century.

Early life

Flavio Chigi was born 10 May 1631 in Siena, the son of Mario Chigi and Berenice della Ciaia (a noblewoman from Siena). He studied philosophy and law and obtained a doctorate in utroque iuris. When his uncle Fabio Chigi was made Legate to Germany, Chigi followed him there but was soon sent back to Italy to complete his studies.

In 1656, he was made Governor of Fermo and in 1658 he was made Governor of Tivoli. In the meantime, his uncle had been elected Pope in 1655 and had taken the papal throne as Pope Alexander VII. In 1657, Chigi was appointed as his Cardinal-Nephew.

Cardinalate

Upon his elevation to Cardinal, Chigi was appointed Cardinal-Priest of Santa Maria del Popolo.

In 1659, at the death of Cardinal Luigi Capponi, Chigi was appointed Librarian of the Holy Roman Church and held the role for several years.

In 1664, Chigi was received by King Louis XIV of France.

Following the death of his uncle, he oversaw the creation of the tomb for Alexander VII, designed by Gianlorenzo Bernini

Papal conclave of 1667

Pope Alexander VII died on 22 May 1667, and 64 cardinals came together for the papal conclave of 1667.

The College of Cardinals was divided into several factions. The strongest of them was the party loyal to Chigi, which grouped twenty-four of the Cardinals his uncle had created. Another influential person was Dean of the College, Francesco Barberini, who was leader of the group of old cardinals created by his uncle Pope Urban VIII. Small but important because of the possibility of using the right of exclusion were the factions of the so-called "Crown-Cardinals", of Spain and France. They represented the respective interests of Charles II of Spain and Louis XIV of France.

The French party was instructed to work for the election of cardinal Secretary of State Giulio Rospigliosi. Unlike France, Spain placed its interests in the hand of the incompetent ambassador Marquis Astorga. He allied himself with Chigi, although initially Barberini tried to obtain Spanish support for his own candidature.

Initially Chigi, supported by the Spanish party, proposed to elect cardinal Scipione d'Elci, but was not able to secure for him the required majority of two thirds. The alliance between the representatives of two major Catholic powers proved decisive and on 20 June 1667, Cardinal Giulio Rospigliosi was elected to the papacy, receiving all votes except those of his own and of Neri Corsini, who voted for Chigi.

See also
Villa Cetinale
Lelio Colista

References

1631 births
1693 deaths
17th-century Italian cardinals
Cardinals created by Pope Alexander VII
People from Siena
University of Siena alumni
Cardinal-bishops of Albano
Cardinal-bishops of Porto